Ortholepis betulae is a moth of the family Pyralidae described by Johann August Ephraim Goeze in 1778. It is found in the Europe.

The wingspan is 24–27 mm. The moth flies in one generation from May to August .

The caterpillars feed on birch.

Notes
The flight season refers to Belgium and the Netherlands. This may vary in other parts of the range.

References

External links
 waarneming.nl  
 Lepidoptera of Belgium

Moths described in 1778
Phycitini
Moths of Japan
Moths of Europe